Diffwys West Top is a top of Diffwys in Snowdonia, North Wales, near Barmouth and forms part of the Rhinogydd. It is a grassy summit found on the west ridge. The summit is marked with a pile of stones, below which is the crags of Craig Bodlyn and the glacial lake, Llyn Bodlyn. Moelfre is to the north.

References

External links 
www.geograph.co.uk : photos of Diffwys and surrounding area

Dyffryn Ardudwy
Llanelltyd
Mountains and hills of Gwynedd
Mountains and hills of Snowdonia
Hewitts of Wales
Nuttalls

cy:Diffwys